Nyagan Airport  is an airport in Khanty-Mansi Autonomous Okrug, Russia located 12 km east of Nyagan. It services medium-sized airliners.  It was opened in 1993.

Airlines and destinations

References

Airports built in the Soviet Union
Airports in Khanty-Mansi Autonomous Okrug